Angleton ISD is a public school district in Angleton, Texas (USA), operating 5 levels of education.  Established in 1897, AISD encompasses  in Brazoria County, serving Angleton as well as the Village of Bonney, the Sandy Point census-designated place, parts of the CDP of Rosharon, and the unincorporated areas of Chocolate Bayou, Lochridge, and Otey.

Finances
As of the 2010–2011 school year, the appraised valuation of property in the district was $2,145,243,000. The maintenance tax rate was $0.104 and the bond tax rate was $0.042 per $100 of appraised valuation.

Academic achievement
In 2011, the school district was rated "recognized" by the Texas Education Agency.  Thirty-five percent of districts in Texas in 2011 received the same rating. No state accountability ratings will be given to districts in 2012. A school district in Texas can receive one of four possible rankings from the Texas Education Agency: Exemplary (the highest possible ranking), Recognized, Academically Acceptable, and Academically Unacceptable (the lowest possible ranking).

Historical district TEA accountability ratings
2011: Recognized
2010: Exemplary
2009: Recognized
2008: Recognized
2007: Recognized
2006: Academically Acceptable
2005: Academically Acceptable
2004: Recognized

Schools
In the 2011–2012 school year, the district had students in twelve schools.

Regular instructional
High schools
Angleton High School (Grades 9-12)
Junior high schools
Angleton Junior High School (Grades 6-8)
Elementary schools
Central Elementary (Grades PK-5)
Frontier Elementary (Grades K-5)
Northside Elementary (Grades PK-5)
Rancho Isabella Elementary (Grades K-5)
Southside Elementary (Grades K-5)
Westside Elementary (Grades K-5)

Alternative instructional
Angleton High School - ACE (Grades 9-12)
Brazoria County Juvenile Detention (Grades 5-12)
Brazoria County Alternative Education Center (Grades 3-12)
Student Alternative Center (DAEP Grades 1-12)

Special programs

Athletics
Angleton High School participates in the boys sports of baseball, basketball, football, soccer, and swimming. The school participates in the girls sports of basketball, soccer, softball, swimming, and volleyball. For the 2020 through 2022 school years, Angleton High School will play football in UIL Class 5A.

Operations
Within the 2 miles, the district does not always grant school bus service.

See also

List of school districts in Texas
List of high schools in Texas

References

External links

Angleton, Texas
School districts in Brazoria County, Texas